Kuffour is a surname. Notable people with the surname include:

Bice Osei Kuffour (born 1981), Ghanaian hiplife musician
Emmanuel Osei Kuffour (born 1976), Ghanaian footballer
Isaac Kuffour (born 1978), Ghanaian footballer
Jo Kuffour, (born 1981), English-born Ghanaian footballer
Nana Kuffour (born 1985), Ghanaian-American soccer player
Samuel Kuffour (born 1976), Ghanaian footballer